Bayanzürkh (rich heart) is one of nine Düüregs (districts) of the Mongolian capital of Ulaanbaatar. It is subdivided into 20 Khoroos (subdistricts).

It is the largest district in the capital and lies in the southeast of the city. It was established in 1965. In 2006 it had an approximate population of 184,690 in 44,138 households. A total of 23 state kindergartens and 19 secondary schools are located in the district area. By 2019 this district has 405 people and 26436 animals.

Bayanzürkh is located in the east, at the foot of one of the four mountains of Ulaanbaatar, the Bayanzürkh Uul.

Economy
The head office of Eznis Airways is located in the Shine Dul Building (Шинэ Дөл Билдинг) in Bayanzürkh. The head office moved there by 27 August 2011.

Notable people
Shirnengiin Ayuush (1903-1938), composer and writer
Damdin Sükhbaatar (1893-1924), born in Amgalan

References

Districts of Ulaanbaatar